Southpacific (colloquially, "SoPac") was a Canadian post-rock/space rock band with prominent shoegaze leanings, originally based in Ottawa. Southpacific's guitar-oriented music was generally psychedelic in nature and filled with reverb, yet at times contained sheets of noise and heavy drumming.

History
Southpacific's members were multi-instrumentalists Joachim Toelke (primarily electric guitar), Graeme Fleming (primarily drums/percussion), and Phil Stewart-Bowes (primarily bass guitar). The trio formed in 1997, began playing live in 1998, and went on to release two recordings on the Turnbuckle label.

Their self-titled 1998 EP/mini album (also known as 33) was supposedly recorded in a ski chalet. Southpacific soon relocated to the more musically-fertile community of Toronto.  Full-length album Constance was recorded in early to mid-1999, and made it to stores in early 2000. The band never released any singles. The music was highly recording studio-intensive, using many layers of guitar tracks and subtle samples to create a dense overall sound. Only one of the band's songs ("Built To Last") had vocals.

They performed at the 1999 Canadian Music Week Festival, and embarked on a cross-Canada tour with indie rockers Tristan Psionic and Crooked Fingers between April and May 2000. The band's last performance was on August 26, 2000, with shoegaze band SIANspheric.

Southpacific released Depths, their first track since the disbandment in 2000, digitally on February 21, 2020.

Post-breakup

After disbanding in August 2000, Toelke focused on an experimental recording project entitled Frihavn, which created a demo CD.  Turnbuckle Records soon folded, leaving southpacific's albums both out of print.  Fleming and Stewart-Bowes are both currently residing in Toronto, while Toelke has been living in Europe since 2003.

Discography

Albums
Constance - Turnbuckle 2000

EPs/Mini-albums
33 - self-released on 15 August 1998; promo release (green cover) on Turnbuckle, 1999; re-pressed (purple cover) in 2000
Radar Road - 2023

Singles
Depths - 2020

References

External links
Southpacific Official website

"Here Come The Waves" Eye Weekly coverage of the CMW showcase Archived at the Wayback Machine.
Southpacific at eMusic

Musical groups established in 1997
Musical groups disestablished in 2000
Musical groups from Ottawa
Canadian post-rock groups
Canadian shoegaze musical groups
Canadian space rock musical groups
1997 establishments in Ontario
2000 disestablishments in Ontario